Charles Joseph "Slim" Lonsdorf  (March 22, 1905 – December 10, 1987) was an American professional basketball player. He played for the Sheboygan Red Skins in the National Basketball League during the 1938–39 season.

References

1905 births
1987 deaths
American men's basketball players
Basketball players from Wisconsin
Forwards (basketball)
Guards (basketball)
People from Manitowoc, Wisconsin
Sheboygan Red Skins players